Frank Albert Young (June 22, 1876 – April 3, 1941) served in the United States Marine Corps. He received the Medal of Honor for his actions during the China Relief Expedition.

Young was born on June 22, 1876, in Milwaukee, Wisconsin. He died on April 3, 1941, and was buried at Arlington National Cemetery, in Arlington, Virginia.

Medal of Honor citation
His award citation reads:
For extraordinary heroism in action in the presence of the enemy during the battle of Peking, China, 20 June to 16 July 1900. Throughout this period, Private Young distinguished himself by meritorious conduct.

See also

 List of Medal of Honor recipients for the Boxer Rebellion

References

External links
 
 

1876 births
1941 deaths
United States Marines
American military personnel of the Boxer Rebellion
United States Marine Corps Medal of Honor recipients
Burials at Arlington National Cemetery
Military personnel from Milwaukee
Boxer Rebellion recipients of the Medal of Honor